Sharurspor PFK is an Azerbaijani football club based in Baku.

History 
The club was founded in 2015 and participates in the Azerbaijan First Division.

Stadium 
Bayil Stadium is a football stadium in the Bayil district of Baku. The stadium was one of the venues during 2012 FIFA U-17 Women's World Cup.

Managers
 Mahammadali Ganiyev (2015–)

References

Football clubs in Azerbaijan
Association football clubs established in 2015
2015 establishments in Azerbaijan
Defunct football clubs in Azerbaijan
Association football clubs disestablished in 2017
2017 disestablishments in Azerbaijan